The Rande Bridge is a cable-stayed bridge 9 kilometres from the city of Vigo and 18 kilometres from the city of Pontevedra, in the Province of Pontevedra, Spain. It spans Vigo bay across the Rande Strait, linking the municipalities of Redondela and Moaña.

History
It was designed by Italian engineer Fabrizio de Miranda, the Spaniard Florencio del Pozo (who was also in charge of its foundations), and Alfredo Passaro. The bridge was built in 1978 and opened in 1981, just over a year before start of the 1982 FIFA World Cup. It forms part of the AP-9 motorway. It was exclusively a toll bridge until 2006, when it became a shadow toll stretch.

It has a length of 1,604 metres, its pillars have a height of 148 metres and its main span measures 401 metres. Although it was not the biggest (cable-stayed) span in the world when it opened, it was the longest span with more than two lanes.

It currently carries around 50,000 vehicles per day. It is believed that there will be congestion problems in the near future, so the widening alternative has already been studied and projected. Since its opening to traffic in 1981, more than 230 million vehicles have passed through it. It did cost 3,658 million pesetas to build at the time.

In February 2015, Widening works have started, with an estimated investment of 107,9 million euro.

See also
 Battle of Vigo Bay, hold in the area
 Vigo, Pontevedra, Moaña and Cangas, Pontevedra, the places linked

References

Sources
 (it) De Miranda F., Leone A., Passaro A., 1979, Il ponte strallato sullo stretto di Rande presso Vigo, in "Costruzioni Metalliche", 2/1979.
 (it) De Miranda F., 1980, I ponti strallati di grande luce, Zanichelli Bologna (I), pp. 259–269.

External links
 flickr photo

Bridges completed in 1978
Cable-stayed bridges in Spain
Bridges in Galicia (Spain)
Road bridges in Spain
Former toll bridges